The 1912 Cleveland Naps season was a season in American baseball. The Naps had two of the best hitters in the majors in Shoeless Joe Jackson and Nap Lajoie. Despite this, they ended up back in the second division, finishing in fifth place with a record of 75-78.

Regular season 
April 20, 1912: The Naps played in the first ever game at Navin Field in Detroit against Ty Cobb's Detroit Tigers. Navin Field, later known as Tiger Stadium, opened the same day as Fenway Park. It was supposed to have opened on April 18 (like Fenway Park) but it rained in both cities on that day. Naps batter Shoeless Joe Jackson scored the first run ever at Navin Field, though the Tigers would win the game 6–5. Although Jackson would go on to hit a team leading .395 for the season including 3 home runs and 90 RBI's, he finished second in batting average to Ty Cobb who hit .409 for the year.

Season standings

Record vs. opponents

Roster

Player stats

Batting

Starters by position 
Note: Pos = Position; G = Games played; AB = At bats; H = Hits; Avg. = Batting average; HR = Home runs; RBI = Runs batted in

Other batters 
Note: G = Games played; AB = At bats; H = Hits; Avg. = Batting average; HR = Home runs; RBI = Runs batted in

Pitching

Starting pitchers 
Note: G = Games pitched; IP = Innings pitched; W = Wins; L = Losses; ERA = Earned run average; SO = Strikeouts

Other pitchers 
Note: G = Games pitched; IP = Innings pitched; W = Wins; L = Losses; ERA = Earned run average; SO = Strikeouts

Relief pitchers 
Note: G = Games pitched; W = Wins; L = Losses; SV = Saves; ERA = Earned run average; SO = Strikeouts

Awards and honors

League top five finishers 
Vean Gregg
 #4 in AL in strikeouts (184)

Shoeless Joe Jackson
 MLB leader in hits (226)
 #2 in AL in batting average (.395)
 #2 in AL in on-base percentage (.458)
 #2 in AL in slugging percentage (.579)
 #3 in AL in runs scored (121)

George Kahler
 AL leader in walks allowed (121)
 #2 in AL in losses (19)
 #3 in AL in earned runs allowed (101)

Nap Lajoie
 #4 in AL in batting average (.368)

References

External links
1912 Cleveland Naps season at Baseball Reference

Cleveland Guardians seasons
Cleveland Naps season
Cleveland Naps